Cynthia Maduengele Bolingo Mbongo (born 12 January 1993), known as Cynthia Bolingo, is a Belgian sprinter. She won the silver medal in the 400 metres at the 2019 European Athletics Indoor Championships.

Bolingo competed in the 200 metres at the 2015 World Championships in Beijing without advancing from the first round.

On 1 June 2021, she broke the Belgian record on the 400 metres at a meeting in Montreuil, France; with a time of 50 seconds and 75 hundreds, she improved upon the 16-year-old time of 51 seconds 45 hundreds by Kim Gevaert, and qualified to compete at the 2020 Olympics. A month later, she broke it again, lowering it to 50.29 seconds.

International competitions

Personal bests
 60 metres indoor – 7.25 (Louvain-La-Neuve 2022)
 100 metres – 11.28 (+1.1 m/s, Nivelles 2021)
 200 metres – 22.79 (+1.2 m/s, Nivelles 2021)
 200 metres indoor – 24.92 (Ghent 2011) 
 300 metres – 36.47 (Leuven 2022) 
 400 metres – 50.19 (Brussels 2022) 
 400 metres indoor – 51.62 (Glasgow 2019) 
 100 metres hurdles – 13.97 (-0.6 m/s, Herve 2011) 
 60 metres hurdles indoor – 8.38 (Ghent 2011)

References

External links

 

1993 births
Living people
Belgian female sprinters
Belgian sportspeople of Democratic Republic of the Congo descent
World Athletics Championships athletes for Belgium
Olympic athletes of Belgium
Olympic female sprinters
Athletes (track and field) at the 2016 Summer Olympics
Competitors at the 2017 Summer Universiade
People from Uccle
Sportspeople from Brussels